Direction Island may refer to:
 Direction Island, Antarctica, another name of Bearing Island in Antarctica
Australia:
Direction Island (Cocos (Keeling) Islands) 
Direction Island (Kimberley coast)   
Direction Island (Exmouth Gulf)